The Patagonian bonneted bat (Eumops patagonicus), also called the Patagonian dwarf bonneted bat, is a species of free-tailed bat found in Argentina, Bolivia and Paraguay.

Taxonomy and etymology
It was described as a new species in 1924 by British zoologist Oldfield Thomas. Thomas had obtained the holotype from Argentinean-Italian scientist Roberto Dabbene, who worked in Buenos Aires at the time. Its species name "patagonicus" means "belonging to Patagonia." The Patagonian bonneted bat was widely considered a subspecies of the dwarf bonneted bat (Eumops bonariensis) from approximately 1932 until the 1990s. Based on Gregorin et al.'''s 2016 classification, the Patagonian bonneted bat is a member of the bonariensis species group of the genus Eumops.
Other members include the dwarf bonneted bat, E. delticus, and E. nanus''.

Description

Range and habitat
Its range includes several countries in southern South America, including Argentina, Bolivia, and Paraguay.

Conservation
It is currently evaluated as least concern by the IUCN—its lowest conservation priority. It meets the criteria for this assessment because it has a large range, its population size is likely large, and it is not thought to be in rapid population decline.

References

Eumops
Mammals of Patagonia
Mammals of Argentina
Mammals of Bolivia
Mammals of Paraguay
Mammals described in 1924
Bats of South America
Taxa named by Oldfield Thomas